Seedan is a 2011 Indian Tamil-language romantic fantasy drama film directed by Subramaniam Siva. The film stars Unni Mukundan and Ananya in the lead, and features Dhanush in an extended cameo appearance, while Suhasini Mani Ratnam, Sheela, Vivek, Ponvannan, and Ilavarasu appear in supporting roles.

The film, a partial remake of the 2002 Malayalam film, Nandanam, released on 25 February 2011 to mixed reviews. This film was dubbed in Malayalam as Mahalakshmi.

Plot
Mahalakshmi is a servant at the residence of the elderly Amritavalli. Everyone is really fond of her and treats her as one of the family, not a servant. However, she finds herself doing all the work in the house. She is also a great devotee of the indian god Murugan. Despite residing in Pazhani, she is unable to attend a Murugan temple there.

In a dream, she finds herself at her wedding with an unknown man. The next day that man comes to the house. He is none other than Amritavalli's own grandson Mano Ramalingam. He falls in love with Maha. Maha, though hesitant at first, finds herself in love with him as well. Mano constantly assures Maha that his mother will arrange marriage. However, as fate has it, Mano is afraid to admit to his mother Thangam that he is in love. This encourages Thangam to fix his marriage with her childhood friend's daughter. However, when Thangam learns of the love affair, she is helpless, and all she is able to do is encourage the lovebirds to forget each other. Soon, everyone (except Amritavalli, Thangam and Mano) treats Maha as a servant, not a family member. Maha, angry, claims to Lord Murugan that she will not face ever again.

Enters Saravanan, who enters as a cook appointed by Madhava Gounder. Everyone finds Saravanan's cooking awesome. However, Maha disapproves as cooking was her only peaceful hobby in the house after she fell in Love. Saravanan is told to stay in the guest house where Gumbidiswamy is staying. Gumbidiswamy is a fraud and is now trying to pass as a swami. For this reason, he has stayed at their house. It did not take Saravanan long to realize that Gumbidiswamy is a fraud, and he used this to blackmail him. Having this control over Gumbidiswamy, Saravanan tells him to tell everyone that according to background and religious research, Mano and his fiancee are not suitable for each other.

After doing many things such as this, Saravanan is able to unite Maha and Mano. Thangam and Amritavalli agree to let Mano marry Maha. Maha and Mano (on the day of their wedding) search for Saravanan to thank him for his help. Instead of Saravanan, another person comes and says he is the only Saravanan around the area. Disappointed, Maha goes to Murugan's Altar to pray and there she sees Saravanan. He soon fades away. At that point, Maha understood that Saravanan was Murugan himself. The film ends with a message that god may come down to earth in a human form to help those in need.

Cast
 Dhanush as Saravanan and Murugan (cameo appearance)
 Unni Mukundan as Mano Ramalingam (credited as Jai Krishna)
 Ananya as Mahalakshmi
 Sheela as Amritavalli
 Suhasini Maniratnam as Thangam
 Vivek as Gumbidi Swami
 Ponvannan as Vijay
 Ilavarasu as Madhava Kounder
 Meera Krishnan as Janaki
 Cell Murugan as Gumbidiswamy's assistant
Mayilsamy as Gumbidiswamy's follower
 P.S. Seethalakshmi

Production
In early 2003, Sibi Sathyaraj was set to make his acting debut through Swami, the Tamil remake of the Malayalam film Nandanam (2003), directed by Renjith. Navya Nair was cast as the lead actress and A. R. Rahman was considered as the music composer, in the film to be produced by Swargachitra Appachan. However, despite beginning pre-production work, the film was later dropped.

Music
The soundtrack album was composed by Dhina in his 50th film.

Reception

Critical response
Rohit Ramachandran of nowrunning.com gave it 3/5 stars stating that "Seedan spirals downward and falls flat on its face." The Times of India gave the film three out of five stars and wrote that "Though Subramaniam Siva meanders in the first half by making substantial changes in the original, he displays a much better grip in the second, which makes the movie an enjoyable watch".

References

External links
 

2011 romantic drama films
2011 films
2010s Tamil-language films
Indian romantic drama films
Tamil remakes of Malayalam films
Films directed by Subramaniam Siva